In the 2011 Census of India, an urban agglomeration was defined as "An urban agglomeration is a continuous urban spread constituting a town and its adjoining outgrowths, or two or more physically contiguous towns together with or without outgrowths of such towns. An Urban Agglomeration must consist of at least a statutory town and its total population (i.e. all the constituents put together) should not be less than 20,000 as per the 2001 Census."

List 
Below is a list of urban agglomerations in the state of Karnataka, with a population of above 100,000 and above. This statistical data is based on the Census of India (2011).

See also 
List of districts of Karnataka
List of most populous metropolitan areas in India
List of states and union territories of India by population
Demographics of India
List of cities in Karnataka by population
List of million-plus urban agglomerations in India

References 

Karnataka-related lists